Joseph Smith was a Presbyterian minister, author, and academic.

The grandson of Joseph Smith, the frontier missionary, he graduated from Jefferson College (now Washington & Jefferson College) in 1815 and attended Princeton Theological Seminary from 1817-1818. He was licensed to preach in 1819 and worked as a missionary in Virginia from 1818-1822. He was President of Franklin College in New Athens, Ohio from 1837 to 1838.

References

Washington & Jefferson College alumni
Franklin College (New Athens, Ohio)
Princeton Theological Seminary alumni
Year of death unknown
1796 births